Marin Draganja and Dino Marcan were the reigning champions but did not defend their title as they had both retired from professional tennis.

Boris Arias and Federico Zeballos won the title after defeating Diego Hidalgo and Cristian Rodríguez 7–6(7–3), 6–1 in the final.

Seeds

Draw

References

External links
 Main draw

Aberto Santa Catarina de Tenis - Doubles